Victoria Park is an urban park on Spring Garden Road in Halifax, Nova Scotia, Canada, across from the Halifax Public Gardens.

The North British Society erected various monuments and statues: Robert Burns, Sir Walter Scott and William Alexander, 1st Earl of Stirling.

At the south end of the park Sidney Culverwell Oland created a fountain in memory of his wife Linda Oland (1966).

Robert Burns statue 

George A. Lawson created the memorial to Robert Burns in Ayr, inaugurated in 1892. Other versions were circulated to Dublin, Melbourne, Montreal, Winnipeg, Halifax and elsewhere.  The statue was cast in Halifax in 1919.  On the base of the Rabbie Burns statue are commemorations of the following poems:
Front:	The Cotter's Saturday Night  – “From scenes like these old Scotia’s grandeur springs.” (1786). A "Cotter" (a peasant given a Cottage in exchange for labour) and his family relax on Saturday evening, after a week of work, knowing Sunday is a day of rest. 
Right:	Tam O’Shanter’s Ride – “Ae spring brought off her master hale but left behind her ain grey tail.” (1791) One of Burns most famous poems. A sculpture of the final scene when Tam O'Shanter safely reaches Brig o' Doon after almost being captured by witches.
Left:	The Jolly Beggars : Love and Liberty - A Cantata (1785) Scene of a group of Ayrshire vagrants drinking one night in Poosie Nansie’s tavern in Mauchline. A maimed homeless veteran sings a song of his long service, fighting first in the Battle of the Plains of Abraham ("the heights of Abram")  
Back:      To a Mountain Daisy, On Turning one Down, With The Plough, in April 1786 – “Wee, modest, crimson-tipped flow’r; Thou’s met me in a evil hour.” (1786) Scene of a farmer using the fate of a ploughed under flower (Bellis perennis)  as a metaphor for life.

Gallery

See also 
List of Robert Burns memorials

References

External links

 William Alexander monument

Parks in Halifax, Nova Scotia
Urban public parks in Canada
Robert Burns